James Blundell may refer to:

James Blundell (physician) (1790–1878), English obstetrician
James Blundell (singer) (born 1964), Australian country music singer
James Blundell (album), 1989